Point du Jour International is a French documentary and magazine producer and publisher, with a headquarters in Paris, France.

Notable documentaries
 Eurasia (joint production with NHK)

References

External links
 Point du Jour International 

Mass media companies of France
Mass media in Paris